The 305th Infantry Division (designated 305. Infanterie-Division in German) was a German Army unit that saw extensive, front-line action during World War II. This division was present at the Battle of Stalingrad, the Battle of Monte Cassino, and surrendered to U.S. Army's 88th Infantry Division in Northern Italy near Trento in late April 1945.

Formation

The 305th Infantry Division was part of the 13th wave of Wehrmacht mobilizations October through November 1940. As of December 1940, the 305th Infantry Division was based out of Ravensburg, Upper Swabia on the Bodensee.

Division history

Battle of Stalingrad

The 305 Infantry Division was under the command of Lieutenant General Kurt Oppenländer during the Battle of Stalingrad.
Infanterie-Regiment 578 was disbanded on 21 December, due to the Divisions inability to maintain three line regiments, and its constituent Bataillone were redistributed to the Divisions remaining Infanterie Regiments. The remnants of the Division surrendered in the northern kessel on 2 February 1943.
Under Construction

First formation
By December 1940, the 305th was as a garrison division absorbing one-third of the 78th Infantry Division and the 296th Infantry Division.
On 7 February 1942 the division was converted from garrison division to a field division.
In March 1942 divisions received full armaments and was led up to staff infantry division.
In May 1942 the division arrived on southern segment front in Russia, where it participated as part of the VIII Army Corps in the Second Battle of Kharkov and Battle of Kalach.
From August 1942 the division is engaged against Soviet forces towards Stalingrad and later in the city of Stalingrad itself.
The division was destroyed in the North Sector of Stalingrad in January 1943. 
Last units of the 305th see action on 1 February 1943 near the tractor factory in the North Sector of Stalingrad.Very few survivors and wounded made it out of the city.

Second formation 
The 305th ID was reformed in Brittany (France) during the first half of 1943.

After Mussolini's fall, the division was relocated in August 1943, to the Ligurian coast in the Italian theater of war. During Operation Achse, she was entrusted with the occupation of the military port of La Spezia, but could not prevent the escape of the Italian warships anchored there.

In October, the division was moved to southern Italy in the eastern section of the Volturno Line, where she took part in defensive battles against the advancing 5th US Army. She then withdrew to the Sangro River in the eastern section of the Gustav Line. After the fall of the Gustav Line in the spring of 1944, the division, with the allies in close pursuit, marched towards Umbria and had to be replenished with troops from the 94th Infantry Division. 
Before retreating to the Gothic Line in the summer of 1944, she fought against Allied forces in Tuscany near Arezzo and in Casentino. From autumn 1944 to the Allied spring offensive in April 1945, the 305th division was stationed in Romagna, east of Bologna. The division was taken prisoner in May 1945 north of Lake Garda.

War crimes
The division has been implicated in a number of war crimes in Italy between October 1943 and April 1945, with up to twelve civilians executed in each incident.

Commanding officers
Generalleutnant Kurt Pflugradt (15 Dec 1940 – 12 Apr 1942)
Generalleutnant Kurt Oppenländer (12 Apr 1942 – 1 Nov 1942)
Generalleutnant Bernhard Steinmetz (1 Nov 1942 – 31 Jan 1943)
 Dr. Ing. Albrecht Czimatis (31 Jan - 2 Feb 1943), surrendered
General der Artillerie Friedrich-Wilhelm Hauck (5 Mar 1943 – ? Dec 1944)
Oberst Friedrich Trompeter (? Dec 1944 – 29 Dec 1944)
Generalmajor Friedrich von Schellwitz (29 Dec 1944 – 8 May 1945)

Order of battle

1942
Infanterie-Regiment 576
Infanterie-Regiment 577
Infanterie-Regiment 578
Artillerie-Regiment 305
Pionier-Bataillon 305
Panzerjäger-Abteilung 305
Nachrichten-Abteilung 305
Versorgungseinheiten 305

1944
Grenadier-Regiment 576
Grenadier-Regiment 577
Grenadier-Regiment 578
Füsilier-Bataillon 305
Artillerie-Regiment 305
Pionier-Bataillon 305
Panzerjäger-Abteilung 305
Nachrichten-Abteilung 305
Feldersatz-Bataillon 305
Versorgungseinheiten 305

Knight's Cross Holders
Wilhelm Braun (20-January-1943)Josef Bruetsch (17-February-1945)Kurt Oppenländer (25-July-1942)

References

German

English

Military units and formations established in 1940
German units at the Battle of Stalingrad
Infantry divisions of Germany during World War II
Upper Swabia
Military units and formations disestablished in 1945